Parliamentary Business is an Indian digital news channel headquartered in Noida, Uttar Pradesh. It is a Research & Media platform based on Parliamentary System (Parliament & State Assembly). Parliamentary Business reports on information regarding Members of Parliament’ and critics their performance and productivity when in session, their focus is to hold Parliamentarians accountable through their reporting.

History
Parliamentary Business is owned by PB Broadcast Media Private Limited, which was incorporated in 2013. The Parliamentary Business is founded by Neeraj Gupta and Rohit Saxena.

Parliamentary Business was inaugurated by Sumitra Mahajan, speaker of 16th Lok Sabha.

References

2017 establishments in Uttar Pradesh
Mass media agency
Mass media in Uttar Pradesh